Borun Qeshlaq-e Olya (also Romanized as Borūn Qeshlāq-e ‘Olyā; also known as Borūn Qeshlāq) is a village in Angut-e Sharqi Rural District, Anguti District, Germi County, Ardabil Province, Iran. As of the 2006 census, its population was 21, in 4 families.

References 

Towns and villages in Germi County